Aga or AGA may refer to:

Business
Architectural Glass and Aluminum (AGA), a glazing contractor, established in 1970
AGA (automobile), Autogen Gasaccumulator AG, 1920s German car company
AGA AB, Aktiebolaget Svenska Gasaccumulator, a Swedish company, the originator of the AGA Cooker
Aga Rangemaster Group, British manufacturer
AGA cooker, an oven and cooker
Abellio Greater Anglia, former name of Greater Anglia, a train company in the United Kingdom

People
Aga Khan (disambiguation)
Ağa (Ottoman Empire), an Ottoman Turkish military and administrative rank
Alejandro G. Abadilla (1906–1969), Filipino poet
Aga Radwańska, Polish tennis player
AGA (singer), Hong Kong singer

Given name
Aga of Kish, Ensi of Kish and King of Sumer
Ağa Aşurov (1880–1936), Azerbaijani statesman
Aga Muhlach (born 1969), Filipino actor and producer
Aga Zaryan (born 1976), Polish vocalist
Aga, a diminutive of the Russian female first name Agafa
Aga, a diminutive of the Russian male first name Agafangel
Aga, a diminutive of the Russian male first name Agafodor
Aga, a diminutive of the Russian male first name Agafon
Aga, a diminutive of the Russian male first name Agafonik
Aga, a diminutive of the Russian female first name Agafonika
Aga, a diminutive of the Russian male first name Agap
Aga, a diminutive of the Russian female first name Agapa
Aga, a diminutive of the Russian male first name Agapit
Aga, a diminutive of the Russian female first name Agapiya
Aga, a diminutive of the Russian female first name Agata (a variant of Agatha)
Aga, a diminutive of the Russian male first name Agav
Aga, a diminutive of the Russian male first name Agavva
Aga, a diminutive of the Russian female first name Avgusta

Surname 
Ağa, a Turkish surname
Alemu Aga (born 1950), Ethiopian musician
Anu Aga (born 1942), Indian businesswoman
Maria-Laura Aga (born 1994), Belgian footballer
Patrick Aga, Nigerian politician
Ragheb Aga (born 1984), Kenyan cricketer
Selim Aga (–1875), Sudanese writer

Groups
American Gaming Association
American Gas Association
American Gastroenterological Association
American Go Association, organization to promote the board game of Go
American Grandprix Association
Assemblies of God in Australia, a Pentecostal denomination
Association of Government Accountants, government accounting professional organization that issues the Certified Government Financial Manager
Australian Go Association, governing body for the board game Go

Medicine
Androgenetic alopecia
Anti-gliadin antibodies
Aspartylglucosaminidase
Appropriate for gestational age, referring to prenatal growth rate

Places
Aga, Egypt
Aga, Niigata, Japan
Aga Point, Guam
Al Massira Airport, Agadir, Morocco
Brestovăț, Timiș County, Romania, called  in Hungarian
Monte Aga, mountain in Italy
Aga (river), a tributary of the Onon in Zabaykalsky Krai, Russia

Other
 Aga (bird), Chamorro language name of Corvus kubaryi, the Mariana crow
 Aga (bug), a genus of assassin bugs in the tribe Harpactorini
 Ága (film), a 2018 Bulgarian film
 Aga is the word for Karuka in the Kewa language
 Aga saga
 Aguano language
 Alcohol and Gaming Authority, government body in Nova Scotia, Canada
 Alte Gesamt-Ausgabe, 19th century publication of compositions by Franz Schubert
 Amiga Advanced Graphics Architecture, a Commodore Amiga graphics chipset
 Art Gallery of Alberta, an art museum in Edmonton, Alberta, Canada
 AGA, a codon for the amino acid arginine
 Attorney General of Alabama
 Attorney General of Alaska
 Attorney General of Alberta
 Attorney General of Anguilla
 Attorney General of Argentina
 Attorney General of Arizona
 Attorney General of Arkansas
 Attorney-General of Australia
 Auditor-General for Australia

See also
Agga (disambiguation)
Aegea
Agha (disambiguation)